"Black Superman (Muhammad Ali)" is a song by English songwriter Johnny Wakelin from his album of the same name. The song reached #7 on the UK Singles Chart and #21 on the Billboard Hot 100 in 1975. 

"Black Superman (Muhammad Ali)" is a reggae version of Wakelind's song "Hungarian Superman (Joe Bugner)" (an homage to the Hungarian-born British-Australian boxer by that name) with the lyrics modified to pay tribute to boxer Muhammad Ali.

Charts

Weekly charts

Year-end charts

References

1974 songs
1975 songs
Songs about Muhammad Ali